Lee Thompson (born 5 March 1997) is an English sprinter specialising in the 400 metres. He won the gold medal in the 4 × 400 metres relay at the 2017 European U23 Championships.

International competitions

1Did not finish in the final

Personal bests
Outdoor
100 metres – 10.66 (Sheffield 2021)
200 metres – 21.32 (Stretford 2020)
300 metres – 32.75 (Sheffield 2021)
400 metres – 46.20 (Nuneaton 2020)
Indoor
200 metres – 21.60 (Sheffield 2018)
400 metres – 46.23 (Birmingham 2018)

References

1997 births
Living people
English male sprinters
British male sprinters
Athletes (track and field) at the 2020 Summer Olympics
Olympic athletes of Great Britain